The 2018–19 East Super League (known as the McBookie.com East Superleague for sponsorship reasons) was the 17th season of the East Superleague, the top tier of league competition for SJFA East Region member clubs.

The season began on 4 August 2018 and ended on 27 May 2019. Bonnyrigg Rose were the reigning champions but cannot defend their title after moving to the East of Scotland Football League. 

Lochee United won their third title with two games remaining on 20 May 2019 after a 2–0 win away to Forfar West End, before going on to end the season unbeaten. As winners they enter the 2019–20 Scottish Cup at the preliminary round stage.

Teams

For the 2018–19 season, league reconstruction reduced the Superleague from sixteen to twelve teams after 24 Junior clubs moved to the East of Scotland Football League

The following teams changed division after the 2017–18 season.

To East Superleague
Promoted from East Premier League
 Downfield
 Fauldhouse United
 Glenrothes
 Kirriemuir Thistle
 Tayport
 Thornton Hibs
 Whitburn

From East Superleague
Transferred to East of Scotland League
 Bo'ness United
 Bonnyrigg Rose Athletic
 Broxburn Athletic
 Camelon Juniors
 Dundonald Bluebell
 Hill of Beath Hawthorn
 Jeanfield Swifts
 Linlithgow Rose
 Newtongrange Star
 Penicuik Athletic
 Sauchie Juniors

Stadia and locations

Managerial changes

League table

Results

References

6
East Superleague seasons